Natalia Peixinho Sanchez (born 12 May 1988) is a Brazilian group rhythmic gymnast. She represents her nation at international competitions. She competed at world championships, including at the 2005, 2007 and 2009 World Rhythmic Gymnastics Championships.

Notes

References

External links
 

1988 births
Living people
Brazilian rhythmic gymnasts
Place of birth missing (living people)
Pan American Games medalists in gymnastics
Pan American Games gold medalists for Brazil
Gymnasts at the 2007 Pan American Games
Medalists at the 2007 Pan American Games
People from São Bernardo do Campo
Sportspeople from São Paulo (state)
21st-century Brazilian women